Alexander Smith may refer to:

Politics
 Alexander Smith (American politician) (1818–1878), American businessman and congressman-elect
 Alexander Kennedy Smith (1824–1881), Scottish/Australian engineer and politician
 Alexander Mortimer Smith (1818–1895), Scottish/Canadian soldier, businessman, and political figure
 Alexander Wilson Smith (1856–1913), farmer and political figure in Ontario, Canada
 Alexander S. Smith (1868–1916), politician in Saskatchewan, Canada
 Alexander Lockwood Smith (born 1948), New Zealand politician

Religion
 Alexander Smith (bishop, born 1684) (1684–1766), Scottish Roman Catholic bishop
 Alexander Smith (bishop, born 1813) (1813–1861), Scottish Roman Catholic bishop
 Alexander Hale Smith (1838–1909), American religious leader

Literature
 Alexander Smith (biographer) (fl. 1714–1726), British compiler of volumes of biographies
 Alexander Smith (poet) (1829–1867), Scottish poet
 Alexander Howland Smith (1859–1913), Scottish document forger in the 1880s
 Alexander McCall Smith (born 1948), British writer and professor of medical law
 Alexander O. Smith (born 1973), English/Japanese translator and writer
 Alexander Gordon Smith (born 1979), British author of books for children and young adults

Other
 John Adams (mutineer) (1767–1829), mutineer on HMS Bounty, known as Alexander Smith
 Alexander Smith (chemist) (1865–1922), American chemist and author
 Alexander Smith (golfer) (fl. 1860), Scottish golfer
 Alexander H. Smith (1904–1986), American mycologist
 Ross Alexander (1907–1937), American actor, born Alexander Ross Smith
 Alexander Smith (businessman), British CEO of Pier I
 Sandy Smith (born 1983), Scottish artist

See also
Alex Smith (disambiguation)
Alec Smith (disambiguation)
Alexander Smith Cochran (1874–1929), American sportsman and philanthropist
Alexander Smith Taylor (1817–1876), collector, author and historian
Alexander Smith Carpet Mills Historic District, listed on the U.S. National Register of Historic Places
Alexander Smith House (disambiguation)